ZoneAlarm Secure Wireless Router Z100G is a discontinued Unified Threat Management security router for the home and SOHO market.

The Z100G was developed by SofaWare Technologies, a Check Point Company. The hardware is similar to SofaWare's Safe@Office and VPN-1 Edge lines, and the software differs only in what features the license allows the user to access and to what degree.

Features 
ZoneAlarm Z100G provides networking and security related features, including -

 Router with 4 Fast Ethernet LAN ports and one WAN port.
 Wireless access point with 108 Mbit/s Super G and Extended Range (XR) technologies.
 Stateful Inspection Firewall
 Remote Access VPN for a single user at a time
 Intrusion Prevention IPS
 Gateway Antivirus
 Web filtering
 USB 2.0 Print Server
 Security Reporting
 Integrated ActiveX Remote Desktop client to connect to internal computers

Performance 
 Firewall Throughput - 70 Mbit/s
 VPN Throughput - 5 Mbit/s (AES)
 Concurrent Firewall Connections - 4,000

External links 
 ZoneAlarm Z100G Home Page
 ZoneAlarm Z100G Technical Specifications

Firewall software